2 Days or Die is an album that was released on February 25, 2004 by Atlas Plug. The album was originally released only as a digital release (MP3), and later on CD.

The album was mostly overlooked by mainstream reviewers, although it did receive some positive coverage.

Track listing
 "Halfway Till Bliss"
 "The Ace The Only"
 "2 Days or Die"
 "Rule The World"
 "Get Rolled On"
 "Truth Be Known"
 "Crimson Phoenix"
 "Winds of Sand"
 "Steel Run"
 "Infiltrate This"

Appearances
"The Ace the Only" made its appearance in Project Gotham Racing 3 and MLB 2006 as an in game soundtrack. "2 Days or Die", "Rule the World", and "Get Rolled On" all appear in the racing game Rallisport Challenge 2. 'Halfway Till Bliss' was featured in TimeShift.
Crackdown features the songs
"Halfway Till Bliss"
"The Ace The Only"
"Rule The World"
"Get Rolled On"

References

2005 debut albums
Atlas Plug albums
FiXT albums
Albums produced by Tom Salta